Martín Suárez (born 20 April 1977) is an Uruguayan basketball player, currently playing for Cader in the Uruguayan second division. He plays as a small forward.

References

1977 births
Living people
Basketball players at the 1999 Pan American Games
Pan American Games competitors for Uruguay
Uruguayan men's basketball players
Small forwards